Macedonians in Bosnia and Herzegovina refers to the group of ethnic Macedonians who reside in Bosnia and Herzegovina.

According to the last Yugoslav census in Bosnia and Herzegovina of 1991, there were 1,596 Macedonians in the country. 

The 2013 census counted 738 members of the Macedonian national minority.

History

Macedonians started migrating to the territory of today's Bosnia and Herzegovina at the beginning of the 20th century.

A new wave of Macedonians followed in the period after the Second World War, when both Bosnia and Herzegovina and North Macedonia were part of the newly established Socialist Federal Republic of Yugoslavia.

The Macedonians mainly settled in towns, namely Banja Luka, Sarajevo, Zenica, Bijeljina, Doboj, Derventa, Mostar, Zvornik, Prijedor and other places.

Organizations

The Macedonians of Bosnia and Herzegovina have established two organizations, the first one was established in Sarajevo in 1992. The other one, the Association of Macedonians of the Republic of Srpska, was founded in 2002 and is based in Banja Luka.

References 

Ethnic groups in Bosnia and Herzegovina
Macedonian diaspora